Adam Ołdakowski (born 25 December 1955 in Giżycko) is a Polish politician. He was elected to Sejm on 25 September 2005, getting 7488 votes in 34 Elbląg district as a candidate from the Samoobrona Rzeczpospolitej Polskiej list.

He was also a member of Sejm 2001-2005.

See also
Members of Polish Sejm 2005-2007

1955 births
Living people
People from Giżycko
Members of the Polish Sejm 2005–2007
Members of the Polish Sejm 2001–2005
Self-Defence of the Republic of Poland politicians
University of Warmia and Mazury in Olsztyn alumni